Sovaprevir (codenamed ACH-1625) is an experimental drug designed to treat the hepatitis C virus. It is under development by Achillion Pharmaceuticals. It acts as a NS3/4A inhibitor.Sovaprevir received fast track status from the U.S. Food and Drug Administration in 2012.

References

External links 
 Achillion Provides Pipeline Update

Cyclopropyl compounds
NS3/4A protease inhibitors
1-Piperidinyl compounds
Quinolines
Sulfonamides
Vinyl compounds